In automata theory, a self-verifying finite automaton (SVFA)
is a special kind of a nondeterministic finite automaton (NFA)
with a symmetric kind of nondeterminism
introduced by Hromkovič and Schnitger.
Generally, in self-verifying nondeterminism,
each computation path is concluded with any of the three possible answers:
yes, no, and I do not know.
For each input string, no two paths
may give contradictory answers,
namely both answers yes and no on the same input are not possible.
At least one path must give answer yes or no,
and if it is yes then the string is considered accepted.
SVFA accept the same class of languages as deterministic finite automata (DFA)
and NFA but have different state complexity.

Formal definition 

An SVFA is represented formally by a 6-tuple,
A=(Q, Σ, Δ, q0, Fa, Fr)
such that (Q, Σ, Δ, q0, Fa)
is an NFA,
and Fa, Fr are disjoint subsets of Q.
For each word w = a1a2 … an,
a computation is a sequence of states
r0,r1, …, rn, in Q with the following conditions:
 r0 = q0
 ri+1 ∈ Δ(ri, ai+1), for i = 0, …, n−1.
If rn ∈ Fa then the computation is accepting,
and if rn ∈ Fr then the computation is rejecting.
There is a requirement that for each w
there is at least one accepting computation
or at least one rejecting computation
but not both.

Results 

Each DFA is a SVFA, but not vice versa.
Jirásková and Pighizzini
proved that 
for every SVFA of n states,
there exists an equivalent DFA
of  states.
Furthermore, for each positive integer n, there exists an n-state SVFA
such that the minimal equivalent DFA has exactly  states.

Other results on the state complexity of SVFA
were obtained by Jirásková and her colleagues.

References 

Finite automata